The 1948 Georgia Tech Yellow Jackets football team represented the Georgia Tech Yellow Jackets of the Georgia Institute of Technology during the 1948 college football season.

Clay Matthews Sr. and Frank Ziegler were on this team.

Schedule

References

Georgia Tech
Georgia Tech Yellow Jackets football seasons
Georgia Tech Yellow Jackets football